This is a list of cities in Wallonia, the southern part of Belgium. The status of "city" is historical and does not necessarily mean it has a high number of inhabitants: see city status in Belgium for more information.

Of the 262 Wallon communes, only 69 have the title city. They are as follows:

See also

 City status in Belgium
 List of cities in Belgium
 List of cities in Flanders

External links 
 Union of Cities and Municipalities in Wallonia

Populated places in Wallonia
Wallonia